Global South Development Magazine (GSDM) is an online magazine dedicated to international development issues. The magazine is inspired by the idea of citizen journalism and primarily covers developmental issues of developing countries. From 2010 to 2015, GSDM was a quarterly magazine published by a Finnish non-profit development media organisation Silver Lining Creation. As of 2018, the magazine is published by Helsinki-based media organization, Global South Media Action, which also runs the online education platform, UniDevv.

History
The first issue of the quarterly magazine was published in March 2010 dedicating its first cover issue to the Copenhagen Climate Change Summit. Since then subsequent issues were published and were made available online. On 11 September 2011, the magazine team was expanded with an Assistant Editor and a number of other special correspondents  The magazine team claimed that within a relatively short period of its inception, their publication had been received very well and still has an influential global readership. GSDM's distribution was free of charge. In 2012, the magazine launched a separate website] to archive its published articles and special reports. In 2013, GSDM introduced the concept of Development Reporters as an effort to encourage students of development studies and community activists to write about global development issues.

The team
Global South Development Magazine has been run by its global editorial team which by June 2012 consisted of 40 professional volunteers from different parts of the world. The magazine has an executive editorial team, five regional editors, a group of special correspondents and numerous country reporters.

Covered issues 

GSDM has covered many issues that range from development aid to environmental sustainability. On its October 2011 edition, the magazine criticized Apple Inc. for their poor philanthropy records. The magazine's April 2012 edition was dedicated to the Democratic Republic of the Congo with an in-depth report on the humanitarian situation in the country.

Special correspondents
As of April 2014, 10 special correspondents reported on 10 different development themes prioritised by the magazine. Namely the themes were: 
Women's issues in Africa
Global environmental issues
Climate change
Global Health
Livelihood & Global Economic Affairs
Global Education
Development Aid 
Global Peace & Security Issues 
South-to-South Development Cooperation
Development & Democracy in Africa
Food Sovereignty and Rural Livelihoods

Environmental concerns
Despite its "print-like" content and popularity, GSDM, reportedly, never issued printed copies because of the magazine's commitment to environment-friendly activities.

See also
 Global South
 Developing countries
 Voluntarism
 Citizen Journalism

References

External links
 Official website

2009 establishments in Finland
2015 disestablishments in Finland
Defunct political magazines published in Finland
Development studies journals
English-language magazines
Environmental magazines
Free magazines
Magazines established in 2009
Magazines disestablished in 2015
Magazines published in Helsinki
Online magazines with defunct print editions
Quarterly magazines published in Finland